Bill Davis Stadium is a baseball venue located in Columbus, Ohio, United States.  The stadium is home to the Ohio State Buckeyes baseball team of the Big Ten Conference and is named for William C. "Bill" Davis, a businessman and Ohio State alumnus.

The stadium has a capacity of 4,450 and had a record attendance of 5,360, versus the Minnesota Golden Gophers baseball team on May 18, 2002. In 2010, the Buckeyes ranked 46th among Division I baseball programs in attendance, averaging 1,235 per home game.

The venue hosted the Big Ten Tournament in 1999, 2001, and 2010.

In 2011, the playing field was named in honor of former Buckeye and MLB All-Star/World Series Champion Nick Swisher, thus the official name of the Buckeyes' home is "Nick Swisher Field at Bill Davis Stadium"

In 2012, college baseball writer Eric Sorenson ranked the stadium as the most underrated venue in Division I baseball.

See also
 List of NCAA Division I baseball venues

References

External links
Bill Davis Stadium

Ohio State Buckeyes baseball
Ohio State Buckeyes sports venues
Sports venues in Columbus, Ohio
Sports venues completed in 1997
College baseball venues in the United States
Baseball venues in Ohio
University District (Columbus, Ohio)
1997 establishments in Ohio